George Lundberg may refer to:
 George A. Lundberg (1895–1966), American sociologist
 George D. Lundberg, American physician
 George G. Lundberg (1892–1981), Brigadier-General in the United States